Biblio.com is an international online marketplace specializing in rare and collectible books. Biblio.com was established in 2000 in Asheville, North Carolina, by Brendan J. Sherar and Michael C. Tracey. Biblio.com announced a joint three-way agreement with Bibliopolis, LLC and Antiquarian Booksellers' Association of America (ABAA) in April 2009, to provide a new e-commerce site for ABAA members and their books.

Founding
Biblio was founded in 2000 as a metasearch or price comparison engine company. In 2003, it began hosting its own online marketplace. In May 2009, Biblio expanded to the United Kingdom and other parts of Europe.

Technology
Biblio.com provides BiblioDirector, an inventory management software that works on both Biblio and other marketplaces. Biblio.com provided Bookhound inventory management program for free to its sellers from June 2008 to December 2012. An updated version of Bookhound is still available for sale through Bibliopolis.

As of 2008, Biblio.com launched a complete overhaul of their site. Their new site was built on the Solr search engine, a subproject of the Apache HTTP Server Lucene project. The Solr search engine allows one to search by author, title, illustrator, data, among other parameters. Biblio's stated goal for search is to help customers find titles in as few clicks as possible.

Corporate structure and partnerships

Biblio.com is wholly owned and operated by Biblio, Inc., a privately held company. The company advertises its use of a triple bottom line and runs in charity programs called Ecosend and Biblio Charitable Works, Inc. Biblio describes itself as the first online book marketplace to offer carbon-free shipping through its Ecosend program, purchasing carbon offsets for the shipment of every book sold through its site.

On April 17, 2009, Biblio.com announced a joint three-way agreement with Bibliopolis, LLC and Antiquarian Booksellers' Association of America (ABAA) to provide a new e-commerce site for ABAA members. Under the 4-year joint operating agreement, the new ABAA e-commerce site built by Bibliopolis features Biblio.com's search engine and e-commerce technology. In addition to the ABAA site, Biblio runs similar niche-market sites such as Biblion.co.uk and IOBABooks.com (Independent Online Booksellers Association).

See also
List of online booksellers

References

Bibliography

External links
Official Website
Sofan Comics

Book selling websites
Product searching websites